The intensive care unit (ICU) is one of the major components of the current health care system. The advances in supportive care and monitoring resulted in significant improvements in the care of surgical and clinical patients. Nowadays aggressive surgical therapies as well as transplantation are made safer by the monitoring in a closed environment, the surgical ICU, in the post-operative period. Moreover, the care and full recovery of many severely ill clinical patients as those with life-threatening infections occurs as a result of  medical intensive care unit.

However, despite many significant advances in various fields as mechanical ventilation, renal replacement therapy, antimicrobial therapy and hemodynamic monitoring this increased knowledge and the wise use of such technology is not available for all patients. Shortage of ICU beds are an important issue, however even when ICU beds are available significant variability in treatment and in the adherence to evidence-based interventions do not occur.

Tools for ICU quality monitoring

Several measures of ICU performance have been proposed in the past 30 years.  It is intuitive, and correct, to assume that ICU mortality may be a useful marker of quality. However, crude mortality rates does not take into consideration the singular aspects of each specific patient population that is treated in a certain geographic region, hospital or ICU. Therefore, approaches looking for standardized mortality ratios that are adjusted for disease severity, comorbidities and other clinical aspects are often sought. Severity of illness is usually evaluated by scoring systems that integrates clinical, physiologic and demographic variables. Scoring systems are interesting tools to describe ICU populations and explain their different outcomes. The most frequently used are the APACHE II, SAPS II and MPM. The APACHE II, for example, provides an estimate of ICU mortality based on a number of laboratory values and patient signs taking both acute and chronic disease into account. The data used should be from the initial 24 hours in the ICU, and the worst value (furthest from baseline/normal) should be used. The APACHE II can also define "chronic organ insufficiency" - including liver, cardiovascular, respiratory and renal- as well as defining when a patient is immunocompromised. However, newer scores as APACHE IV and SAPS III have been recently introduced in clinical practice. More than only using scoring systems, one should search for a high rate of adherence to clinically effective interventions. Adherence to interventions as deep venous thrombosis prophylaxis, reduction of ICU-acquired infections, adequate sedation regimens and decreasing and reporting serious adverse events are essential and have been accepted as benchmarking of quality. 
 
The complex task of collecting and analyzing data on performance measures are made easier when clinical information systems are available. Although several clinical information systems focus on important aspects as computerized physician order entry systems and individual patient tracking information, few have attempted to gather clinical information generating full reports that provide a panorama of the ICU performance and detailed data on several domains as mortality, length of stay, severity of illness, clinical scores, nosocomial infections, adverse events and adherence to good clinical practice. Through implementing quality initiatives, increasing the quality of care and patient safety are  major and feasible goals. Such systems (for example: Epimed Monitor) are available for clinical use and may facilitate the process of care on a daily basis and provide data for an in-depth analysis of ICU performance.

See also
APACHE II
SAPS III
Intensive care unit

References
 
 
 

 
 The Epimed Monitor ICU Database®: a cloud-based national registry for adult intensive care unit patients in Brazil. Zampieri FG, Soares M, Borges LP, Salluh JIF, Ranzani OT.Rev Bras Ter Intensiva. 2017 Oct-Dec;29(4):418-426. doi: 10.5935/0103-507X.20170062. Epub 2017 Nov 30.
New perspectives to improve critical care benchmarking.  Salluh JIF, Chiche JD, Reis CE, Soares M.Ann Intensive Care. 2018 Feb 2;8(1):17. doi: 10.1186/s13613-018-0363-0.
How to evaluate intensive care unit performance during the COVID-19 pandemic.  Zampieri FG, Soares M, Salluh JIF.Rev Bras Ter Intensiva. 2020 Jun;32(2):203-206. doi: 10.5935/0103-507x.20200040. Epub 2020 Jul 13.

External links
APACHE II Score online
SAPS II Scoring Sheets and Database

Intensive care medicine